Franklin Davies may refer to:

Franklin Davies in Spaghetti House siege
Franklin O. Davies, writer

See also
Frank Davies (disambiguation)
Franklin Davis (disambiguation)